The Scottish Socialist Party United Left was a  grouping in the Scottish Socialist Party.  An appeal to launch this grouping took place on 13 June 2006. Despite bearing many of the hallmarks of a platform within the SSP, United Left did not view themselves as such, and described themselves as a network rather than a platform.  Within the wider SSP however they were widely regarded as a platform.
  
The grouping was formed following a crisis within the party associated with the Tommy Sheridan defamation case and publication of an open letter by former SSP convener Tommy Sheridan, distributed to members which alleged a long-standing slander campaign conducted against him by senior party figures, MSPs and some grassroots activists.

Against a backdrop of rising tension, the group's formation was widely seen as an early indication of an impending purge and possible split within the party. However, that analysis ran counter to the content of the group's appeal, which confirmed the signatories' commitment to uniting and building the SSP as a radical socialist party capable of challenging the capitalist system.

The group's founding statement was initially distributed in the name of Pam Currie, SSP LGBT spokesperson, and three rank-and-file members.  Other signatories include three SSP MSPs, Frances Curran, Rosie Kane, and Carolyn Leckie, co-chair Morag Balfour, the editor of the SSP's weekly paper Joanne Harvie, and both SSP councillors, Keith Baldassara and Jim Bollan.

In response to the formation of the United Left faction within the SSP, supporters of Sheridan formed a grouping they termed "SSP Majority", and issued an Open Letter to SSP members, calling for signatories and supporters.  Many of the signatories to the Majority statement subsequently left the party when Tommy Sheridan formed his own party, Solidarity on 3 September 2006.

The United Left dissolved on 20 January 2007, considering that the grouping had served its purpose, with its members becoming non-platform members of the SSP once again.

External links
 Scottish Socialist Party Website

Factions of the Scottish Socialist Party
Political parties established in 2006
Political parties disestablished in 2007